Piromelatine (Neu-P11) is a multimodal sleep drug under development by Neurim Pharmaceuticals. It is an agonist at melatonin MT1/MT2 and serotonin 5-HT1A/5-HT1D receptors. Neurim is conducting a phase II randomized, placebo controlled trial of cognitive and sleep effects in Alzheimer's disease.

Results of a phase II trial on insomnia in 120 adults were announced in 2013, finding piromelatine 20/50 mg improved sleep over 4 weeks vs placebo. Phase 1A/1B studies in 2011, showed safe dose-dependent improvement in sleep. Pre-clinical studies showed antinociceptive antihypertensive and cognitive benefits in rat disease models of pain, hypertension, and Alzheimer's disease.

Antidepressant and anti-anxiety effects were also demonstrated in animal models.

See also 
 List of investigational sleep drugs

References 

5-HT1A agonists
5-HT1D agonists
Melatonin receptor agonists
Hypnotics
Tryptamines
4-Pyrones